Komoran (in Albanian) or Komorane is a village south of Drenas, in Kosovo.

Notes

References

Villages in Drenas
Drenica